Duarig was a footwear trademark founded in 1886 in Balbigny (France) by M. Giraud.

Sponsorships
Teams that have used Duarig equipment:

Football
  CS Constantine
  São Vicente football team
  Olympique Lyon
  FC Lorient
  SM Sanga Balende
   Al Nassr FC
  Dynamo Kyiv

External links
 Official website

Shoe brands
Shoe companies of France
Sportswear brands
1886 establishments in France
Clothing companies of France
Sporting goods manufacturers of France
Clothing companies established in 1886
Manufacturing companies disestablished in 2014
2014 disestablishments in France